Peter Frey may refer to:

 Peter Frey (journalist) (born 1957), German journalist
 Peter Frey (sailor) (born 1949), Swiss sailor